Coastal landscape (Fishermen going home) is an oil painting by Eugen Dücker.

Description 
The painting's size is 61 x 117.7 cm.
It is in the collection of the Eesti Kunstimuuseum.

Analysis 
The painting shows fishermen with their boats on the beach taking their catch home.

References 

Collections of the Art Museum of Estonia
Estonian paintings